The CWA Cruiserweight Championship is the primary lightweight wrestling title in the Century Wrestling Alliance. It was first introduced as the CWA Light Heavyweight Championship and won by The Tazmaniac who defeated Flexx Wheeler in a tournament final held in Windsor Locks, Connecticut on January 3, 1993. The title was mostly dominated by IWCCW veterans Ray Odyssey and The Pink Assassin, both of whom feuded with El Mascarado over the title for much of the 1990s. The title was renamed as the NWA New England Cruiserweight Championship when the CWA joined the National Wrestling Alliance and became NWA New England in January 1998. A year later, it changed to the NWA New England Junior Heavyweight Championship and co-promoted with NWA East / Pro Wrestling eXpress. The title was defended throughout the New England area, most often in Massachusetts and Connecticut, from 1999 until 2002 when it became inactive for a year. The title was revived as the NWA Cold Front Cruiserweight Championship in 2006 but returned to its original name when the CWA withdrew from the NWA on March 10, 2007.

Title history
Silver areas in the history indicate periods of unknown lineage.

References

National Wrestling Alliance championships
Regional professional wrestling championships
Cruiserweight wrestling championships